Backtrack was an American hardcore punk band from Long Island, New York, founded in 2008.

History 
Backtrack began in 2008 with the release of a demo titled The '08 Demo via Flatspot Records. They released an EP in 2009 via 6131 Records titled Deal With The Devil.

Backtrack released their first full-length album in 2011 titled Darker Half via Reaper Records.

In 2013, Backtrack released a 7" via Bridge 9 Records titled Can't Escape.

In 2014, Backtrack released their second full-length album via Bridge 9 Records titled Lost In Life.

In 2019, the band announced it would be breaking up doing a final tour around America, Asia, and Australia which ended in Amityville, New York on November 30, 2019.

Vitalo went on to form the artist management company Gold Theory Artists.

Band members

Final Members 
James Vitalo – vocals (2008-2019)
Ricky Singh – guitar
Chris Smith – guitar
Danny Smith – bass

Past Members 
Nick Brienza – bass
David Jaycox – bass
Reggie McCafferty – bass
John T. Lopez – drums
Steven DiGenio – drums
Brian Rutter – drums

Discography 
Studio albums
Darker Half (2011, Reaper)
Lost in Life (2014, Bridge Nine)
Bad to My World (2017, Bridge Nine)

EPs and demos
The '08 Demo (2008, Flatspot)
Deal with the Devil (2009, 6131)
Can't Escape (2013, Bridge Nine)
"Bad to My World" b/w "Breaking Loose" – Flexi/Zine (2017, Bridge Nine)

References 

Hardcore punk groups from New York (state)
Bridge 9 Records artists